Agapanthia persica is a species of beetle in the family Cerambycidae. It was described by Semenov in 1893.

References

persica
Beetles described in 1893